Hapithini is a tribe of crickets in the subfamily Hapithinae. There are about 12 genera and more than 260 described species: found in Central and South America.

Genera
These 12 genera belong to the tribe Hapithini:

 Carylla Otte & Perez-Gelabert, 2009
 Gryllophyllus Gorochov, 2017
 Hapithus Uhler, 1864 (flightless bush crickets)
 Knyella Otte & Perez-Gelabert, 2009
 Laurellia Otte & Perez-Gelabert, 2009
 Margarettia Otte & Perez-Gelabert, 2009
 Phyllogryllus Saussure, 1878
 Sabelo Otte & Perez-Gelabert, 2009
 Sipho Otte & Perez-Gelabert, 2009
 Somnambula Gorochov, 2017
 Stenogryllus Saussure, 1878
 Walkerana Otte & Perez-Gelabert, 2009

References

Further reading

 
 

Crickets
Orthoptera tribes